Garab Khvoshadul (also Romanized as Garāb Khvoshādūl and Garāb Khowshādūl) is a village in Shuhan Rural District, in the Central District of Malekshahi County, Ilam Province, Iran. At the 2006 census, its population was 27, in 5 families.

References 

Populated places in Malekshahi County